The 2019 IBSF World Championships were held in Whistler, Canada from February 25 to March 10, 2019.

This would be the last World Championships with the mixed-sleds mixed team eventconsisting of one run each of men's skeleton, women's skeleton, 2-man bobsleigh, and 2-women bobsleighfirst introduced at the 2007 championships. The 2020 championships would see the introduction of a skeleton-only mixed team event, consisting of one run each of men's and women's skeleton.

Schedule
Six events were held.

All times are local (UTC−8).

Bobsleigh

Team Event

Skeleton

Medal summary

Medal table

Bobsleigh

Skeleton

Mixed

References

External links
Official website

 
IBSF
Sports competitions in British Columbia
2019 in Canadian sports
2019 in bobsleigh
2019 in skeleton
Bobsleigh in Canada
Skeleton in Canada
February 2019 sports events in Canada
March 2019 sports events in Canada